The 2013–14 Austrian Cup was the 80th season of Austria's nationwide football cup competition. It commenced with the matches of the First Round on 12 July 2013 and was concluded with the last match in May 2014.

First round
The draw for this round was on 1 July 2013. The match took place between 12 and 14 July 2013.

|-
| colspan="3" style="background:#fcc;"|

|-
| colspan="3" style="background:#fcc;"|

|-
| colspan="3" style="background:#fcc;"|

|}

Second round
The draw for this round was on 6 August 2013. The matches took place on 23−25 September 2013.

|-
| colspan="3" style="background:#fcc;"|

|-
| colspan="3" style="background:#fcc;"|

|-
| colspan="3" style="background:#fcc;"|

|}

Third round
The draw for this round was on 29 September 2013. The matches took place on 28−30 October 2013.

Quarter-finals
The draw for this round was on 3 November 2013. The matches took place on 8 & 15–16 April 2014.

Semi-finals
The draw for this round was on 20 April 2014. The matches took place on 7 May 2014.

Final 
The final was played on 18 May 2014 at the Wörthersee Stadion in Klagenfurt.

|-

|}

Details

External links 

 

Austrian Cup seasons
Cup
Austrian Cup